The 2012 Southern Conference men's basketball tournament will take place between Friday, March 2 and Monday, March 5 in Asheville, North Carolina, at the U.S. Cellular Center. The semifinals will be televised by SoConTV, with the Southern Conference Championship Game televised by ESPN2.

Bracket

All-Tournament Team
First Team

Second Team

References

External links
 SoCon Basketball Championship

Tournament
Southern Conference men's basketball tournament
Basketball competitions in Asheville, North Carolina
College sports tournaments in North Carolina
College basketball in North Carolina
Southern Conference men's basketball tournament
Southern Conference men's basketball tournament